The 2014–15 Wyoming Cowboys basketball team represented the University of Wyoming during the 2014–15 NCAA Division I men's basketball season. Their head coach was Larry Shyatt in his fifth year. They played their home games at the Arena-Auditorium in Laramie, Wyoming. The Cowboys were a member of the Mountain West Conference. They finished the season 25–10, 11–7 in Mountain West play to finish in a tie for fourth place. They defeated Utah State, Boise State and San Diego State to become champions of the Mountain West tournament. They received an automatic bid to the NCAA tournament where they lost in the first round to Northern Iowa.

Previous season
The 2013–14 Wyoming Cowboys finished the season with an overall record of 18–15, 9–9 in the Mountain West to finish in a tie for fifth place. In the Mountain West Conference tournament, the Cowboys were defeated by UNLV in the quarterfinals. They were invited to the College Basketball Invitational where they lost in the first round to Texas A&M.

Preseason
The Cowboys were picked to finish sixth in the Mountain West Conference preseason media poll. Larry Nance Jr. was named the preseason player of the year, as well as being named to the preseason all-Mountain West team.

Regular season
On January 12, 2015 Wyoming was ranked in the Associated Press Top 25 Poll for the first time since 1988.

Players

Departures

Recruiting

Roster

Statistics
Source:

Schedule and results

|-
!colspan=9 style="background:#492f24; color:#ffc425;"| Non-conference regular season

|-
!colspan=9 style="background:#492f24; color:#ffc425;"| Mountain West regular season

|-
!colspan=9 style="background:#492f24; color:#ffc425;"| Mountain West tournament

|-
!colspan=9 style="background:#492f24; color:#ffc425;"| NCAA tournament

Rankings

*AP does not release post-tournament rankings

See also
2014–15 Wyoming Cowgirls basketball team

References

Wyoming Cowboys basketball seasons
Wyoming
Wyoming
Wyoming Cowboys bask
Wyoming Cowboys bask